Map of places in Blaenau Gwent compiled from this list
See the list of places in Wales for places in other principal areas.

This is a list of places in the Blaenau Gwent county borough, South Wales.

Administrative divisions

Electoral wards
Abertillery
Badminton
Beaufort
Blaina
Brynmawr
Cwm
Cwmtillery
Ebbw Vale North
Ebbw Vale South
Georgetown
Llanhilleth
Nantyglo
Rassau
Sirhowy
Six Bells
Tredegar Central & West

Communities
Abertillery
Badminton
Beaufort
Blaina
Brynmawr
Cwm
Ebbw Vale North
Ebbw Vale South
Llanhilleth
Nantyglo and Blaina
Rassau
Tredegar

Principal towns
Abertillery
Brynmawr
Ebbw Vale
Tredegar

Blaenau Gwent
Blaenau Gwent